Events from the year 1818 in Denmark.

Incumbents
 Monarch – Frederick VI
 Prime minister – Joachim Godske Moltke

Events
 26 May  The County of Lerchenborg is established by Christian Cornelius Lerche from the manors of Lerchenborg and Aunsøgård as well as the farms Mineslund, Asnæsgård, Lerchenfeld, Birkendegård, Vesterbygård, Astrup and Davrup.

Undated

Births
 3 February – Anton Melbye, marine painter and daguerreotype photographer (died 1875)
 8 February – Carl Frederik Sørensen, marine painter (died 1879)
 10 March – Johan Vilhelm Gertner, portrait painter (died 1871)
 13 August – Johan Daniel Herholdt, architect (died 1902)
 1 September – Johan Lundbye, painter (died 1848)
 17 September  Louise Sahlgreenm actress (died 1891)

Undated

 Pennefejden: A bitter literary feud between Jens Baggesen and Adam Oehlenschläger.

Deaths
 25 March – Caspar Wessel, mathematician (born 1745)
 25 April – Johan Martin Quist, architect (born 1755)

References

 
1810s in Denmark
Denmark
Years of the 19th century in Denmark